Tuomas Petteri Sammelvuo (born 16 February 1976) is a Finnish professional volleyball coach and former player. He currently serves as head coach for the Canada national team and the Polish PlusLiga team, ZAKSA Kędzierzyn-Koźle.

Sammelvuo is still the only Finnish male volleyball player to have won the Champions League (2005). Having played 296 games in the national team, he has the second largest number of games in the Finnish volleyball history.

Personal life
Sammelvuo has two brothers and a sister. He speaks six languages: Finnish, French, English, Italian, Polish and Russian, is married to Petra and has two children.

Career

Early career
Sammelvuo started his volleyball career in Pudasjärvi, northern Finland. When he turned 16, he moved to Tampere. Sammelvuo played in Finnish youth national team, which reached fourth place at the 1995 Junior World Championship.

Finland
Sammelvuo started his professional career at the age of sixteen, in Raision Loimu. In the 1993–94 season, he played in Loimu and won the Finnish championship bronze medal. After that, he moved to KuPS, and won two Finnish Champion titles and one silver medal.

Professional career
From KuPS, Sammelvuo moved to the French team, Strasbourg VB. Sammelvuo spent there one year, and then moved to Stade Poitevin Poitiers. In 2000, he signed a contract in Italy, and started playing in Cuneo. Sammelvuo played for them for two seasons before moving to Piacenza. In Piacenza, he won the Italian Cup. In 2003, he returned to France and joined Tours VB.

In his first season in France, Sammelvuo won the French Champion title and made it to the Champions League semifinals, losing there to Lokomotiv Belgorod, the future competition winner. He ended the next season in Tours as the Champions League winner, being the first ever player from Finland to win the trophy.

After two seasons spent in Tours, Sammelvuo moved to Japan and started playing for Toyoda Gosei Trefuerza. He was the first ever Finnish volleyball player in Japan. 

In 2006, Sammelvuo joined the Russian team, Dynamo Kaliningrad. 

The 2008–09 season, Sammelvuo spent playing in Italy for Tonno Callipo Vibo Valentia. For the 2009–10, he signed a contract with the Polish PlusLiga team, ZAKSA Kędzierzyn-Koźle. In 2011, he joined the Russian team, Lokomotiv Novosibirsk. He came back to Lokomotiv for the 2012–13 season, after one season spent in Italy.

National team
He was appointed captain of the Finnish national team in 1997. At the 2007 European Championship held in Russia, Finland came in fourth place and made Finland ball games history. Overall, Sammelvuo played 296 games in the national team.

Honours

As a player
 CEV Champions League
  2004/2005 – with Tours VB
 CEV Challenge Cup
  2001/2002 – with Noicom Cuneo
 National championships
 1994/1995  Finnish Cup, with KuPS Kuopio
 1994/1995  Finnish Championship, with KuPS Kuopio
 1995/1996  Finnish Cup, with KuPS Kuopio
 1995/1996  Finnish Championship, with KuPS Kuopio
 1998/1999  French Championship, with Stade Poitevin Poitiers
 2001/2002  Italian Cup, with Noicom Brebanca Cuneo
 2003/2004  French Championship, with Tours VB
 2004/2005  French Cup, with Tours VB
 2010/2011  Russian Cup, with Lokomotiv Novosibirsk

As a coach
 CEV Cup
  2020/2021 – with Zenit Saint Petersburg

 National championships
 2018/2019  Russian Championship, with Kuzbass Kemerovo
 2022/2023  Polish Cup, with ZAKSA Kędzierzyn-Koźle

Individual awards
 2014: Coach of the Year in Finland

References

External links

 
 Player profile at LegaVolley.it 
 Player profile at PlusLiga.pl 
 
 
 Coach/Player profile at Volleybox.net

1976 births
Living people
People from Pudasjärvi
Sportspeople from North Ostrobothnia
Finnish men's volleyball players
Finnish volleyball coaches
Finnish expatriate sportspeople in France
Expatriate volleyball players in France
Finnish expatriate sportspeople in Italy
Expatriate volleyball players in Italy
Finnish expatriate sportspeople in Japan
Expatriate volleyball players in Japan
Finnish expatriate sportspeople in Russia
Expatriate volleyball players in Russia
Finnish expatriate sportspeople in Poland
Expatriate volleyball players in Poland
Finnish expatriate sportspeople in Canada
ZAKSA Kędzierzyn-Koźle players
ZAKSA Kędzierzyn-Koźle coaches
Outside hitters